JKO may refer to:
 J. K. Organisation
 Jacqueline Kennedy Onassis (1929–1994), First Lady of the United States
 Jacqueline Kennedy Onassis Reservoir in Central Park, New York City
 Junkers, a former German aircraft manufacturer
 Kubo language, a Trans–New Guinea language of New Guinea, spoken in the plains of the Strickland River.\